Tumwater is a city in Thurston County, Washington, United States. The population was 25,350 at the 2020 census. The city is situated near where the Deschutes River enters Budd Inlet, the southernmost point of Puget Sound; it also borders the state capital of Olympia to the north. Tumwater is the oldest permanent Anglo-American settlement on Puget Sound.

Etymology
Tumwater was originally called "New Market" by American settlers, and under the latter name was platted in 1845. The present name is derived from Chinook Jargon and means "waterfall". A post office called Tumwater was established in 1863.

History
The site of Tumwater and Tumwater Falls has been home to Southern Lushootseed-speaking peoples known as the Steh-Chass / Stehchass or Statca'sabsh (a subtribe of the Sahewamish (Sahe'wabsh), an subgroup of the Nisqually people; who became part of the post-treaty Squaxin Island Tribe) for thousands of years. "Steh-Chass" is the Lushootseed name for Budd Inlet, Deschutes River and the Tumwater Falls area, and for an important village of the Statca'sabsh.

The city incorporated in 1875.

The construction of Interstate 5, which was completed in 1958, required the demolition of 100 buildings in downtown Tumwater. Major businesses had already relocated northeast to Tumwater Square, which remains a local shopping center. The Tumwater Historic District was listed on the National Register of Historic Places in 1978 to preserve remnants of downtown amid plans to widen Interstate 5.

Geography
Tumwater is located south of the neighboring state capital of Olympia.

Climate
This region experiences warm and dry summers, with average monthly temperatures between 71.6 °F (22 °C) and 98.1 °F (36.7 °C). According to the Köppen Climate Classification system, Tumwater has a very warm-summer Mediterranean climate, abbreviated "Csb" on climate maps.

Demographics
Based on per capita income, one of the more reliable measures of affluence, Tumwater ranks 89th of 522 areas in the state of Washington to be ranked. It is also the highest rank in Thurston County.

2010 census
As of the census of 2010, there were 17,371 people, 7,566 households, and 4,460 families living in the city. The racial makeup of the city was 85.0% White, 1.7% African American, 1.2% Native American, 4.8% Asian, 0.5% Pacific Islander, 1.6% from other races, and 5.2% from two or more races. Hispanic or Latino of any race were 6.2% of the population.

There were 7,566 households, of which 28.9% had children under the age of 18 living with them, 40.9% were married couples living together, 13.1% had a female householder with no husband present, 4.9% had a male householder with no wife present, and 41.1% were non-families. 31.6% of all households were made up of individuals, and 9.7% had someone living alone who was 65 years of age or older. The average household size was 2.27 and the average family size was 2.83.

The median age in the city was 35 years. 27% of residents were under the age of 18, 10% from 18 to 24; 31.7% were between the ages of 25 and 44; 26.8% from 45 to 64; and 13% were 65 years of age or older. The gender makeup of the city was 47.7% male and 52.3% female.

2000 census
As of the census of 2000, there were 12,698 people, 5,659 households, and 3,253 families living in the city. The population density was 1,276.1 people per square mile (492.7/km2). There were 5,953 housing units at an average density of 598.2 per square mile (231.0/km2). The racial makeup of the city was 88.41% White, 1.39% African American, 1.24% Native American, 3.90% Asian, 0.36% Pacific Islander, 1.50% from other races, and 3.21% from two or more races. Hispanic or Latino of any race were 4.08% of the population.

There were 5,659 households, out of which 28.3% had children under the age of 18 living with them, 41.5% were married couples living together, 12.3% had a female householder with no husband present, and 42.5% were non-families. 33.7% of all households were made up of individuals, and 10.2% had someone living alone who was 65 years of age or older. The average household size was 2.20 and the average family size was 2.82.

In the city, the age distribution of the population shows 23.2% under the age of 18, 10.9% from 18 to 24, 29.5% from 25 to 44, 23.0% from 45 to 64, and 13.5% who were 65 years of age or older. The median age was 36 years. For every 100 females, there were 89.8 males. For every 100 females age 18 and over, there were 84.5 males.

The median income for a household in the city was $43,329, and the median income for a family was $54,156. Males had a median income of $41,778 versus $32,044 for females. The per capita income for the city was $25,080. About 4.3% of families and 8.5% of the population were below the poverty line, including 9.5% of those under age 18 and 5.2% of those age 65 or over.

Government
Due to the city being located in close proximity to the state capital, Tumwater is home to many state government offices, including the Washington State Department of Corrections, the Washington State Department of Labor and Industries, the Washington State Department of Health, the Washington State Office of the_Insurance Commissioner, the Washington State Department of Revenue and the Office of the Attorney General.

Education
The Tumwater School District is home to numerous schools including Tumwater High School and Black Hills High School.

References

External links

 City of Tumwater, Washington (official website)

 
Cities in Washington (state)
Cities in Thurston County, Washington
Populated places established in 1846
Chinook Jargon place names
1846 establishments in Oregon Country